Ankycorbin is a protein that in humans is encoded by the RAI14 gene. Ankycorbin has been associated with the cortical actin cytoskeleton structures in terminal web, cell-cell adhesion sites as well as stress fibres.

References

Further reading